Anthony Hewitt (born in 1971) is a classical pianist from the Lake District, England.

Described by The Gramophone as "a remarkably gifted artist", and by Alfred Brendel as "a young pianist of remarkable talent", Hewitt now combines his busy concert schedule with the duties of directing the Ulverston International Music Festival.

References

External links
http://www.anthonyhewitt.co.uk
http://www.ulverstonmusicfestival.co.uk

1971 births
English classical pianists
Male classical pianists
Living people
People from Cumbria
21st-century classical pianists
21st-century British male musicians